Rolando Navarrete (born February 14, 1957) is a Filipino former professional boxer who competed from 1973 to 1991. He held the WBC super-featherweight title from August 1981 and May 1982.

Fighting style
A fine boxer, Navarrete had a good talent and was known for his hard-hitting punches.
Known to be a slugger and one of the greatest Filipino knockout artists.

Professional career
He first fought for a world title in 1980 against Alexis Argüello but lost by TKO to the legendary champion. On August 29, 1981, he would win the WBC Super featherweight title by knocking out popular fellow southpaw Cornelius Boza-Edwards in the 5th round of a title match held in Italy. He later defended the title against unknown Choi Chung-Il of Korea, stopping the gritty challenger in the 11th round of a controversial bout held in Manila in January 1982. In his second title defense four months later in Las Vegas, Nevada, Navarrete took on Rafael "Bazooka" Limón. The champion led on all scorecards before getting knocked out by Limón in the 12th round. Thereafter, Navarrete's career went downhill and he would never again figure in big-money fights. In 1984, he was convicted of sexual assault and served three years in a Hawaiian prison.

After his release in March 1988, Navarrete went back to the Philippines and embarked on several comeback fights. In one of those fights, he would exact revenge on his old tormentor Limón, winning by decision in a 10-round bout. During his comeback, he was cast alongside fellow boxer Rolando Bohol by comic book writer Carlo J. Caparas in his boxing film Kambal Na Kamao: Madugong Engkwentro, which was released in mid-1988. A series of losses against local fighters and unranked contenders later forced him to retire for good.

Personal life
Navarrete currently lives in General Santos. A series of failed relationships with different women gave him a total of seven children. One of his sons, Rolando Jr., who fights under his mother's name Rolando Dy, is a professional mixed martial artist.

Troubles outside the ring left Navarrete with no money and the former world champion now sells fish that, according to him, earn him 800 pesos (about 16 dollars) a day. He still trains nowadays with a heavy bag in his home.

He spent three years in a United States prison for rape. Navarrete was also recently involved in various police complaints for wife battery and drugs.

On February 14, 2008, Navarrete, was pronounced out of danger, after being stabbed in the neck by Racman Saliling, a tenant at the boarding house he owns in Bula, General Santos, using an ice pick. Navarrete was also involved in two previous attacks: in 2005, he was hit with a steel pipe by a female neighbor and in 2006, a security guard clubbed his leg with a shotgun at a fishing port.

Legacy
He is ranked the 9th best super featherweight champion in history, by the World Boxing Council. In 2007, Navarrete was included in "Kamao", an episode of award winning program Sine Totoo, which received the RP's first and only George Foster Peabody Award, the equivalent of the Pulitzer Prize.

"Kamao", presented the sports of boxing and featured the story of the former world featherweight champion.

Professional boxing record

See also
List of super-featherweight boxing champions

References

External links

Sunstar.com.ph, Navarette's life in 'Maalaala Mo Kaya'

1957 births
Living people
Bantamweight boxers
Boxers from South Cotabato
Featherweight boxers
Filipino male boxers
Filipinos imprisoned abroad
Lightweight boxers
Prisoners and detainees of Hawaii
World Boxing Council champions
World super-featherweight boxing champions
Sportspeople from General Santos
Super-featherweight boxers